Roberts Ķīlis (14 March 1968 – 18 March 2022) was a Latvian politician and social anthropologist who served as Minister for Education and Science of Latvia.

Biography
Ķīlis received a bachelor's degree from the University of Latvia (1991) in philosophy and a doctor's degree from Cambridge University (1999) in social anthropology. From 1994 onward he was an associate professor at the Stockholm School of Economics in Riga.

Ķīlis was appointed Minister for Education and Science of Latvia in October 2011. Due to health problems, he resigned from office in April 2013.

References

1968 births
2022 deaths
Politicians from Riga
Ministers of Education and Science of Latvia
University of Latvia alumni
Alumni of the University of Cambridge
Academic staff of the Stockholm School of Economics
Social anthropologists
Latvian anthropologists
20th-century anthropologists
21st-century anthropologists
20th-century Latvian politicians